Young Harris College is a private Methodist-affiliated liberal arts college in Young Harris, Georgia, United States.

History

Origins 
The school was founded in 1886 by Artemas Lester, a circuit-riding Methodist minister who wanted to provide the residents of the Appalachian Mountains with an education. The college was funded in part by production from an agricultural program, or college farm. Students who could not afford education were allowed to work on the farm to earn tuition.

Originally known as McTyeire Institute for the small village where the school was located, the college struggled for the first year until an Athens judge, Young L.G. Harris, donated enough money to keep the school open. The school was later renamed Young Harris Institute and became Young Harris College in honor of its benefactor, as was the surrounding town in 1895. A fire destroyed the college's main classroom building in 1911, but it was rebuilt by local townspeople and named Sharp Hall in honor of the college president at the time. The Young Harris Academy was founded in the late 19th century and provided a primary education for thousands of students until it closed after World War II.

Bequest
Margaret Adger Pitts, who died in 1998, left an estate valued at $192 million, mostly in Coca-Cola stock acquired by her father in the 1920s. YHC was one of four Georgia entities named to receive the yearly dividends and trust proceeds, approximately $3 million to each of the beneficiaries. The college announced that the money would be used for scholarships, improvements to the campus, and religious programs.

Transition
Since the early 1910s, YHC was a two-year school, granting associate's degrees. In 2008, the college earned its four-year accreditation through regional accreditation organization, the Southern Association of Colleges and Schools, and was approved to offer bachelor's degrees in biology, business and public policy, English, and music. In February 2010, Young Harris' accreditation was expanded to include communication studies, history, outdoor leadership, theatre, and musical theatre in the list of sanctioned bachelor's programs.

Young Harris College, as of 2022, serves a student body population of approximately 800 residential students, with approximately 100 from the surrounding area. The college has stated its intent to increase enrollment to 1,200 over the next few years. To support this growth, Young Harris has begun to hire "significant new faculty [members]" and to "construct three major new facilities."

New facilities
Enotah Hall, a new residence facility for 200 students, opened in August 2009 between Manget Hall and Rollins Hall. Its suites are arranged with two-bedrooms and two baths for four students, and include computer study spaces, rooms for music practice, and meeting rooms. It was designed to be energy efficient and received a LEED Silver certification.

Construction began on April 24, 2009, on a new, $15 million,  Recreation and Fitness Center. In addition to the fitness center, there is an elevated track, a 37-foot climbing wall, aerobic exercise rooms, 2 basketball courts for intramurals and concession facilities featuring a juice bar. The complex contains a 1,100-seat arena for intercollegiate competition in basketball and volleyball. The lower-level houses locker rooms and offices for coaches and staff. It opened in late July, 2010 with a tour by college president Cathy Cox. The Rec center also received LEED certification.

Following completion of the Rec Center in 2010, a new student residence area, The Village, for 248 students was constructed in 14 apartment buildings where a cluster of the school's tennis courts had been previously located.

The Rollins Campus Center was one of three projects approved for construction in 2008. The O. Wayne Rollins Foundation gave $22 million toward construction of the structure, which has four separate areas: The  student center is used for multiple purposes. The  library is twice the size of the earlier Duckworth Library and has been named for former Governor Zell Miller and his wife Shirley, both distinguished alumni. The new dining hall seats more than 500, almost double the previous dining hall capacity, and the "Charles Suber Banquet Hall" is a rentable facility serving 350. Ground was broken for construction on April 5, 2013, and the facility opened in October 2014. The center received a LEED Gold certification.

The Young Harris Motel was built in 1970 and was a fixture in the town for over 30 years. The college acquired the property in 2012 and the YHC Athletic Department relocated there. The former Mary Ann's restaurant on the property was converted into a  strength and conditioning center for athletes.

Presidents

Academics 
Young Harris College offers Bachelor of Arts, Bachelor of Fine Arts and Bachelor of Science degrees in more than 30 majors and 22 minors. These academic studies consist of course offerings in seven divisions and programs, including the divisions of Education, Fine Arts, Humanities, Mathematics and Science, and Social and Behavioral Sciences; and three or more programs, including Interdisciplinary, Teacher-Preparation, and Pre-Professional programs. The Young Harris College Honors Program is available to high-achieving students. In addition, students may apply to Immersive learning programs, such as First Year Foundations, Scholars Consortium and Academic Fellowships, Rhetorica, and others. International education is offered through faculty-led groups, student-exchange programs, study-abroad affiliates, scholarships, and other means.

Typical classes are small. The ratio of students to faculty at Young Harris is 10:1.

Ranking 

In the 2017 U.S. News & World Report rankings of national liberal arts colleges, Young Harris College was ranked 174.

Athletics

The Young Harris athletic teams are called the Mountain Lions. The college is a member of the Division II level of the National Collegiate Athletic Association (NCAA), primarily competing in the Peach Belt Conference (PBC) for most of its sports since the 2012–13 academic year; while its women's lacrosse team competes in the Gulf South Conference (GSC). The Mountain Lions previously competed in the Georgia Collegiate Athletic Association (GCAA) of the National Junior College Athletic Association (NJCAA) during the 2010–11 school year.

Young Harris competes in 16 intercollegiate varsity sports. Men's sports include baseball, basketball, cross country, golf, lacrosse, soccer and tennis; women's sports include basketball, cross country, golf, lacrosse, soccer, softball, tennis and volleyball; and co-ed sports include spirit cheerleading.

Move to NCAA Division II
On July 1, 2014, the school completed the transition from the GCAA and NJCAA to the NCAA at the Division II level. The college originally applied to the NCAA in 2010, but the application was rejected. The school re-applied in 2011 and received acceptance into the three-year process to become a full member. As of the 2011–12 academic year, Young Harris was in the first year of candidacy-membership.

Student life 
The college offers various opportunities for students to engage, socialize and participate in organizations relating to academic topics, intramural and club sports, media and publications, service, special interest, spiritual and religious, student government and Greek life.

Greek system
The roots of the Young Harris Greek system began with the men's debating societies of the late 1880s. The Young Harris Debating Society (YHDS) and the Phi Chi Debating Society (PC) were academic in nature, and lasted through the 1950s. Young Harris women formed the literary societies Susan B. Harris Society (EBE) and Phi Delta Society (PD).

During the 1960s, these organizations became more social than academic. YHDS was chartered as Upsilon Delta Sigma fraternity in 1967 and paired up with the Susan B. Harris Society, which became known as Sigma Beta Sigma sorority. Phi Chi fraternity linked to Phi Delta sorority. On January 3, 1968, Kappa Tau Omega became the third fraternity on campus with nine charter members. Alpha Iota formed as the third sorority in the early 1970s. In the fall of 1987, Zeta Pi formed as the fourth fraternity on campus. The three other sororities on campus are Delta Phi Epsilon, Gamma Psi and Phi Alpha Phi. 

On February 19, 2010, Young Harris college gained its first nationally affiliated fraternity when 28 undergraduate men formed Kappa Sigma's Rho-Pi chapter. Phi Sigma Kappa national fraternity followed with a colony in early 2014. Phi Sigma Kappa officially chartered on April 25, 2015, becoming the Gamma Octaton Chapter. The first nationally affiliated sorority at YHC was Delta Phi Epsilon (Zeta Zeta chapter in 2016).

Fraternities and sororities are important to campus life at the college. There are thirteen Greek organizations, and students are strongly encouraged to "find the perfect fit".

The college's honor societies include Alpha Iota Sigma, Alpha Chi, Kappa Pi international art society, Lambda Pi Eta communications study society, Mu Phi Epsilon professional music fraternity, Phi Alpha Theta history study society and Sigma Tau Delta English honor society. The college was approved to establish a "circle" of Omicron Delta Kappa in February 2023. The charter will be presented at the college on March 16, 2023.

Culture
Cultural activities available on campus to clubs and individuals include singing group performances and sponsored music events, Campus Gate Art Gallery exhibitions, and Theatre Young Harris dramatic performances. Planetarium shows are featured at the O. Wayne Rollins Planetarium. There are three student publications: the Corn Creek Revue literary magazine, the Mosaic religious-life publication and the Enotah annual yearbook.

Community service opportunities are offered through Greek societies, clubs, and religious organizations, as well as off-campus community organizations.

Dining and recreation
Dining, recreational and student-center activities, movies, and games are available at the Rollins Campus Center, which also houses a library. Dining options include a dining hall and two on-campus chain restaurants. Students at Young Harris College purchase a meal plan, and may also visit diners and restaurants in Young Harris and nearby towns.

Off-campus recreational activities are available, as well. Area lakes and rivers offer fishing, boating, swimming, skiing, white-water rafting, and kayaking. Local parks and other organizations provide picnicking areas, hiking & bicycle trails, farms, vineyards, golf, tennis, and horseback riding. Further exploration may include caving and mountain climbing. Several small towns in Georgia and North Carolina, within a 30-minute drive of campus, feature theaters, galleries, antique stores, thrift shops, and shopping centers.

Cupid Falls waterfall is within easy walking distance of campus. Day trips may be made to Lake Chatuge, Vogel State Park, and Brasstown Bald. The nearest metropolitan cities are Atlanta, Georgia, and Chattanooga, Tennessee (each approximately a two-hour drive from Young Harris).

Alumni
Many Young Harris alumni have chosen careers in public service including the ministry and teaching. Politics has been the choice of a number of others. One U.S. senator, one U.S. representative, two governors, a number of congressmen, state legislators and mayors all started out at YHC.

Notable alumni and instructors
Notable graduates include former Georgia governors E. D. Rivers and U.S. Senator Zell Miller; U.S. Representatives Jack Brinkley and Buddy Carter;  entertainers Oliver Hardy, Wayland Flowers and Amanda Bearse; country music singers Ronnie Milsap and Trisha Yearwood; Major League Baseball players Nick Markakis, Charlie Blackmon, Billy Buckner and Cory Gearrin; Waffle House founder Tom Forkner; state Supreme Court Chief Justices William Henry Duckworth and Charles S. Reid; state Senator J. Ebb Duncan and state Representatives Hank Huckaby and David Ralston. Poet and novelist Byron Herbert Reece was a student and teacher at YHC; theologian and philosopher John B. Cobb taught at the college. James T. McIntyre served as director of the Office of Management and Budget and Fred S. Clinton was a frontier doctor in Oklahoma at the turn of the century. George J. Berry, Atlanta Aviation Commissioner and Georgia Commissioner of Industry, Trade, and Tourism graduated in 1957.
Bettie M. Sellers, poet laureate of Georgia taught English at YHC for over 30 years.
American correspondent Betty Hester attended YHC. as did journalist Winfield Myers.

Honors and Awards
The highest honor bestowed by the college is the Young Harris College Medallion. It has been presented yearly since 1969 to an alumnus, alumna or friend of the College for extraordinary contributions.

Further reading
 A History of Young L.G. Harris College, Joseph Milton Brogdon, 1938
 History of Young L.G. Harris College, Jackson Lance, 1935, 61 pages
 Young Harris College: 1886-1986, Louisa Franklin & Jeffery S. Moody, 1986
 The Miracle of Brasstown Valley, Zell Miller, 2007, 180 pages,

References

External links

 
 Official athletics website

 
Educational institutions established in 1886
Universities and colleges accredited by the Southern Association of Colleges and Schools
Liberal arts colleges in Georgia (U.S. state)
Private universities and colleges in Georgia (U.S. state)
Education in Towns County, Georgia
Buildings and structures in Towns County, Georgia
Methodism in Georgia (U.S. state)
Peach Belt Conference schools
1886 establishments in Georgia (U.S. state)